Hart is a city and county seat of Oceana County, Michigan The population was 2,126 at the time of the 2010 census. The city is located within Hart Township, but is politically independent.

Hart is also home to the north end of the Hart-Montague Trail.

History
Hart was named from its central position in the "heart" of Oceana County.

Hart was founded in 1856 by early pioneers including Nelson Grove. Hart Township was named after Wellington Hart.

Geography

Transportation
 passes west of the city, continuing southerly toward Muskegon and northerly toward Ludington.
 is a spur route into downtown Hart.

Demographics

2010 census
As of the census of 2010, there were 2,126 people, 757 households, and 478 families living in the city. The racial makeup of the city was 84.3% White, 0.5% African American, 0.8% Native American, 0.2% Asian, 12.6% from other races, and 1.6% from two or more races. Hispanic or Latino of any race were 25.7% of the population.

There were 757 households, of which 35.3% had children under the age of 18 living with them, 41.9% were married couples living together, 17.3% had a female householder with no husband present, 4.0% had a male householder with no wife present, and 36.9% were non-families. 32.9% of all households were made up of individuals, and 14.8% had someone living alone who was 65 years of age or older. The average household size was 2.58 and the average family size was 3.23.

The median age in the city was 37.3 years. 26.4% of residents were under the age of 18; 8.8% were between the ages of 18 and 24; 22.7% were from 25 to 44; 22.1% were from 45 to 64; and 19.9% were 65 years of age or older. The gender makeup of the city was 48.2% male and 51.8% female.

2000 census
As of the census of 2000, there were 1,950 people, 759 households, and 481 families living in the city. The racial makeup of the city was 87.69% White, 0.51% African American, 1.38% Native American, 0.26% Asian, 7.59% from other races, and 2.56% from two or more races. Hispanic or Latino of any race were 14.56% of the population.

There were 759 households, out of which 31.6% had children under the age of 18 living with them, 44.7% were married couples living together, 13.8% had a female householder with no husband present, and 36.6% were non-families. 31.6% of all households were made up of individuals, and 16.3% had someone living alone who was 65 years of age or older. The average household size was 2.45 and the average family size was 3.05.

In the city, the population was spread out, with 27.4% under the age of 18, 8.3% from 18 to 24, 28.8% from 25 to 44, 18.3% from 45 to 64, and 17.2% who were 65 years of age or older. The median age was 35 years. For every 100 females, there were 90.2 males. For every 100 females age 18 and over, there were 87.4 males.

The median income for a household in the city was $25,855, and the median income for a family was $31,875. Males had a median income of $28,839 versus $20,125 for females. The per capita income for the city was $13,844. About 17.5% of families and 20.4% of the population were below the poverty line, including 30.6% of those under age 18 and 10.0% of those age 65 or over.

Notable people

Larry Paul Kelley, founder of Shelby Gem Factory
Seymour H. Knox I, Buffalo, New York businessman
Donald W. Wolf, World War II U.S. Marine Corps soldier who was killed in action at Guadalcanal
Walter Willett, physician and nutrition researcher
George Winston, instrumental pop pianist and composer (b. 1949)

Climate
This climatic region is typified by large seasonal temperature differences, with warm to hot (and often humid) summers and cold (sometimes severely cold) winters. According to the Köppen Climate Classification system, Hart has a humid continental climate, abbreviated "Dfb" on climate maps.

References

External links
 City of Hart official website

Cities in Oceana County, Michigan
County seats in Michigan